Tomorrow is a 1972 American drama film directed by Joseph Anthony. The screenplay was written by Horton Foote, adapted from a play he wrote for Playhouse 90 that was based on a 1940 short story by William Faulkner in the short story collection Knight's Gambit.  The PG-rated film was filmed in the Mississippi counties of Alcorn and Itawamba. Although released in 1972, it saw limited runs in the U.S. until re-released about ten years later.

The opening courthouse scenes of Tomorrow were shot at the historic Jacinto Courthouse in Alcorn County, Mississippi. The courthouse, built in 1854, has been refurbished and is listed in the National Register of Historic Places. The majority of the film was shot in the Bounds Crossroads community of Itawamba County, at the sawmill on the farm of Chester Russell, the grandfather of singer Tammy Wynette (Virginia Wynette Pugh), who lived most of her young years there with her grandparents until she married in 1960. The sawmill building, where much of the film was shot, was built just for the film. Chester Russell played one of the jurors and can be seen when the jury is deliberating in the opening courthouse scenes. Some of the film props were also leased from James Franks Antique Museum of Tupelo, Mississippi. Lead Robert Duvall, the only known surviving actor from the film, has called Tomorrow one of his personal favorites.

Plot
An isolated and lonely farmer named Fentry, in rural Mississippi takes in a pregnant drifter who has been abandoned by the father of her child. Told in flashback, twenty years later, the farmer is on a jury and the film, narrated by the defense attorney in the case, explores why he is the lone guilty vote in the trial of a man who killed a man most people considered worthless and no account. In a steady and methodic fashion it is revealed the young man is the son of Sarah Eubanks, the pregnant drifter, with whom Duvall had had an intense personal involvement after he found her in a destitute state, nursed her back to health. She died, and he promised he'd take care of her son.  He raised the boy for a time, loved him, but the boy was taken from him by force by the brothers of the boy's mother.  Their poor upbringing led to the boy becoming a man who people held in such low regard that his murder was regarded as a public service.  Fentry remembers only the child he'd cherished and nurtured, and can't accept his death being treated as an event of no significance.  The attorney looks at Fentry, and realizes this is someone society treats as insignificant, who is actually a person of tremendous character and determination, like so many others who die unnoticed, “The lowly and invincible of the earth—to endure and endure and then endure, tomorrow and tomorrow and tomorrow.”

Main cast

Release
The film opened at the 68th Street Playhouse in New York City and only played 32 playdates around the United States. It was re-released in June 1978 at The Public Theater in New York City.

Critical reception
The film was praised by Rex Reed, Gene Shalit, Archer Winsten and Jeffrey Lyons, with Reed stating that he believed it was the best depiction of Faulkner ever screened. Vincent Canby of The New York Times overall did not care for the film but acknowledged it was well-intentioned:

In the annual Leonard Maltin's Movie Guide, the film was rated 3½ stars, noting that "Bellin is excellent. Duvall astonishingly good in best-ever screen presentation of the author's work".

Trivia
The American indie rock band Grandaddy sampled the film for their song "Fentry".

See also
 List of American films of 1972

References

External links 
 
 
 
Tomorrow at AFI Catalog

1972 films
1972 drama films
American drama films
American black-and-white films
American films based on plays
Films based on works by William Faulkner
Films set in Mississippi
Films shot in Mississippi
Films directed by Joseph Anthony
Films based on adaptations
American Playhouse
1970s English-language films
1970s American films